flyEgypt is an Egyptian low-cost and charter airline headquartered in Cairo.

History
The airline was founded in 2014 as a single class charter operator and started operations on 12 February 2015 with a flight between Cairo and Jeddah. On 11 July 2015 it started a weekly seasonal service between Zürich and Marsa Alam.

Destinations
As of February 2022, FlyEgypt serves the following scheduled destinations (excluding seasonal charter operations):

Fleet
, the FlyEgypt fleet consists of the following aircraft:

References

External links

Airlines of Egypt
Companies based in Cairo
Airlines established in 2014
Low-cost carriers
Egyptian companies established in 2014